Loch Ness is a large freshwater loch in the Scottish Highlands extending for approximately  southwest of Inverness. It takes its name from the River Ness, which flows from the northern end. Loch Ness is best known for claimed sightings of the cryptozoological Loch Ness Monster, also known affectionately as "Nessie". It is one of a series of interconnected, murky bodies of water in Scotland; its water visibility is exceptionally low due to a high peat content in the surrounding soil. The southern end connects to Loch Oich by the River Oich and a section of the Caledonian Canal. The northern end connects to Loch Dochfour via the River Ness, which then ultimately leads to the North Sea via the Moray Firth.

It contains more water than all the lakes in England and Wales combined, and is the largest body of water in the Great Glen, which runs from Inverness in the north to Fort William in the south. It contains a single, artificial island named Cherry Island at the southwestern end. There are nine villages around the loch, as well as Urquhart Castle; the village of Drumnadrochit contains a "Loch Ness Centre and Exhibition".

Geography

At , it is the second-largest Scottish loch by surface area after Loch Lomond, but due to its great depth it is the largest by volume in the British Isles. It contains more water than all the lakes in England and Wales combined, and is the largest body of water in the Great Glen, which runs from Inverness in the north to Fort William in the south. Loch Ness lies along the Great Glen Fault, which forms a line of weakness in the rocks which has been excavated by glacial erosion, forming the Great Glen and the basins of Loch Lochy, Loch Oich and Loch Ness.

Loch Ness has one small island, Cherry Island (meaning Murdoch's Island), at the southwestern end of the loch. It is an artificial island, known as a crannog, and was likely constructed during the Iron Age. There was formerly a second, natural island nearby named Dog Island, but it was submerged when the water level rose. A castle stood on Cherry Island during the 15th century; this was constructed of stone and oak wood and was likely used as a fortified refuge. It has been suggested that Eilean Muireach may have been a hunting lodge, with Eilean Nan Con the home for the hunting dogs.

The loch is one of a series of interconnected, murky bodies of water in Scotland; its water visibility is exceptionally low due to a high peat content in the surrounding soil. The southern end is fed by the River Oich, which runs from Loch Oich. The northern end flows out through the Bona Narrows into Loch Dochfour; the Bathymetrical survey of the Scottish fresh-water lochs considered Loch Dochfour to be distinct from Loch Ness proper, but capable of being regarded as forming part of Loch Ness. Dochgarroch weir at the downstream end of Loch Dochfour delineates the start of the River Ness, which connects to the nearby  and ultimately leads through Inverness to the North Sea via the Moray Firth. Loch Ness forms part of the Caledonian Canal, which comprises  of waterways connecting the east coast of Scotland at Inverness with the west coast at Corpachthe near Fort William. Only one-third of the entire length is man-made, the rest being formed by Loch Dochfour, Loch Ness, Loch Oich, and Loch Lochy, with the man-made canals running parallel with rivers such as the River Oich.

Villages and places

At Drumnadrochit is the "Loch Ness Centre and Exhibition" which examines the natural history and legend of Loch Ness. Boat cruises operate from various locations on the loch shore, giving visitors the chance to look for the "monster".

Lighthouses are located at the northern and southern ends at Lochend (Bona Lighthouse) and Fort Augustus. There is an RNLI lifeboat station on the northern shore near Drumnadrochit, which has been operational since 2008 and was the first non-coastal RNLI station. It is staffed by a volunteer crew and equipped with an inshore lifeboat (ILB).

Etymology
Loch Ness takes its name from the River Ness which flows from the loch's northern end. The river's name probably derives from an old Celtic word meaning 'roaring one'. William Mackay in his 1893 book Urquhart and Glenmoriston: Olden times in a highland parish recounts two Scottish legends that have been reported as the source of the name. In the first, a spring in a valley had been enchanted by Daly the Druid for purity, with the admonition that the well opening must be covered by a stone whenever not in use, or else "desolation will overtake the land". One day a woman left the well uncovered when rushing to save her baby from a fire, and it overflowed and filled the vale, forming the loch. The inhabitants cried out "Tha loch 'nis ann, tha loch 'nis ann!" ("There's a loch now, there's a loch now!"), and so it was named "Loch Nis". A second legend, named "The Tales of the Sons of Uisneach" by Mackay and now considered part of the Ulster Cycle of Irish mythology, recounts the Irish woman Deirdre or Dearduil, "the most beautiful woman of her age", who was courted by the king of Ulster, Conachar MacNessa; she fell in love instead with his cousin Noais, son of Uisneach. They fled to Scotland and were married on the banks of the loch, but Noais was slain by MacNessa, and the Loch Naois, River Naois, and Iverness were named after him. Mackay claims that while these legends are not the "true" origin of the name, that many places in the district have names associated with "The Tales of the Sons of Uisneach", and that the same tales have Conachar MacNessa's mother as the river goddess Ness. He argued instead that the etymology of the Celtic "Ness" derived from earlier words for "river".

Monster

Loch Ness is known as the home of the Loch Ness Monster (also known as "Nessie"), a cryptid, reputedly a large unknown animal. It is similar to other supposed lake monsters in Scotland and elsewhere, though its description varies from one account to the next. Popular interest and belief in the animal's existence have varied since it was first brought to the world's attention in 1933.

Fish species

The following fish species are native to Loch Ness. A number of others such as perch and roach have been introduced in the Loch or Caledonian Canal with various levels of success.

Hydroelectricity
Loch Ness serves as the lower storage reservoir for the 300MW Foyers pumped-storage hydroelectric scheme, which opened in 1975. A smaller (5MW) power station nearby used to provide power for an aluminium smelting plant, but now electricity is generated and supplied to the National Grid. Another scheme, the 100-megawatt Glendoe Hydro Scheme near Fort Augustus, began generation in June 2009. It was out of service between 2009 and 2012 for repair of the tunnels connecting the reservoir to the turbines. The 450 MW / 2.8 GWh Red John project was approved in 2021. If funded at £550 million, it would store 5 million cubic meters of water near Dores.

Gallery

Records
John Cobb died in an attempt at the water speed record when his boat Crusader struck an unexplained wake on the surface of the loch in 1952. His accident was recorded by the BBC reporters on site at the time. Nearby, there is a memorial to him erected by the people of Glenurquhart.

On 31 August 1974, David Scott Munro, of Ross-shire Caberfeidh Water Ski Club, became the first person in the world to water ski (mono ski) the length of Loch Ness.

In July 1966, Brenda Sherratt became the first person to swim the length of the loch. It took her 31 hours and 27 minutes to accomplish this feat.

References

External links

 
 
 
 Cherry Island 
 Cherry Island coordinates: 

Loch Ness
Freshwater lochs of Scotland
Lochs of Highland (council area)
LNess